The Bishop of Hertford is an episcopal title used by a suffragan bishop of the Church of England Diocese of St Albans, in the Province of Canterbury, England. The suffragan See was created by Order in Council of 5 July 1889, but remained dormant until first filled in December 1967. The title takes its name after Hertford, the county town of Hertfordshire. The suffragan Bishop of Hertford, along with the suffragan Bishop of Bedford, assists the diocesan Bishop of St Albans in overseeing the diocese; the bishop has oversight of the archdeaconries of Hertford and St Albans, which cover the deaneries & parishes of Hertfordshire.

The current Bishop of Hertford is The Right Reverend Dr Jane Mainwaring, who took office upon her consecration on 2 February 2023; she is the first woman to hold the office.

List of bishops

References

External links
 Crockford's Clerical Directory - Listings

Bishops of Hertford
Hertford
Diocese of St Albans